The Honorable Congress of the State of Guerrero is the legislative branch of  the government of the State of Guerrero. The Congress is the governmental deliberative body of  Guerrero, which is equal to, and independent of, the executive.

The Congress is unicameral and consists of 46 deputies. 28 deputies are elected on a first-past-the-post basis, one for each district in which the entity is divided, while 18 are elected through a system of proportional representation. Deputies are elected to serve for a three-year term.

See also
List of Mexican state congresses

References

External links
Official website

Government of Guerrero
Guerrero
Guerrero